The 1626 Lingqiu earthquake had an epicentre in Lingqiu County, Shanxi Province during the Ming dynasty. The estimated surface wave magnitude 7.0 earthquake caused many buildings to collapse. Over 5,200 people were killed.

Tectonic setting
The Shanxi Rift System is a seismically active intra-continental rift zone in North China. Since 231 BC, eight  7.0 earthquakes have occurred along the rift system. The 1303 Hongdong, 1556 Shanxi, and 1695 Linfen earthquakes were the deadliest associated with the rift, with death tolls of 50,000 to 830,000 respectively.

Bounded to the west by the Lüliang Mountains, and the east by the Taihang Mountains, the Shanxi Rift forms the eastern boundary of the Ordos Block; a fragment of continental crust within the Eurasian Plate. Within the rift features half-grabens. It formed when extension began in the Miocene or Pliocene, separating the crust into the Ordos Block from the North China Craton. The reason for extension in this part of China is still debated although the most agreed hypothesis is crustal deformation resulting from the India-Asia collision involving the Indian and Eurasian plates along the Main Himalayan Thrust in the Himalayas, causing the rotation of crustal blocks in China. Other hypotheses are slab rollback of the Pacific Plate as it subducts along the east coast of Japan, or localised intraplate tectonics.

Dip-slip and strike-slip earthquakes in North China are consistent with ongoing crustal extension along the Shanxi Rift System. The rift extends for 1,200 km, and is up to 60 km wide. The graben is bounded by normal faults on both sides capable of generating earthquakes. Extension along the rift zone occur at a slow rate of 0.8 ± 0.3 mm/year, therefore earthquakes occur with long intervals of recurrence. The estimated magnitudes of earthquakes by Chinese researchers previously have possible inaccuracies as they are based on written descriptions and death toll from the earthquakes.

Earthquake
The earthquake rupture involved two conjugated faults; the Shuijian–Luoshuihe Fault, and the Huashanhe Fault. The Shuijian–Luoshuihe Fault is located west of Lingqiu County, where is strikes in a north-northeast direction. A one-meter-high fault scarp is visible on the surface, corresponding to the 1626 earthquake. Both faults have shallow dipping angles in the east and west direction, and have a normal slip sense. It has an estimated magnitude of  7.0 and China seismic intensity scale rating of IX (Destructive).

In another study, the earthquake is proposed to have occurred in the Fenwei Graben System along a strike-slip fault.

Damage
At Lingqiu, many homes belonging to officials and civillains were destroyed. Liquefaction events occurred; black water erupted from dry wells. More than 5,200 people died in the county. About 80–90% of government offices, homes, and warehouses collapsed in Hunyuan County. Much of the city walls fell. Additional buildings and structures were left in ruins at Yuxian, and Laiyuan. It was felt in the provinces of Shandong, Hebei, and Henan. The shaking was also felt in Beijing.

See also
 List of earthquakes in China
 List of historical earthquakes

References

1620s disasters
Earthquakes in China
1626 in China
1626 in Asia
Datong
History of Shanxi
1620s earthquakes
1626 earthquakes
1626 in science